Brigadier-General William Ward Warner,  (14 March 1867 – 21 March 1950) was a British Indian Army officer of the late 19th and early 20th centuries who rose to become a brigadier-general in the newly created Royal Air Force towards the end of the First World War.

In the late 19th and early 20th centuries Warner served in India.  He retired from the Indian Army in 1907 but rejoined the British Army early in 1915 after the outbreak of World War I.  His first post was as a staff officer in the Directorate of Military Aeronautics and in 1916 he became the Assistant Adjutant-General at the Directorate.

From 1919 to 1922 he was a member of London County Council for Fulham.

From 1924 to 1929 he was the Conservative MP for Mid Bedfordshire. In later life he was Chairman of the General Hydraulic Company.

Sources
Air of Authority – A History of RAF Organisation – Brigadier-General W W Warner

References

External links 
 

1867 births
1950 deaths
British Indian Army officers
Royal Air Force generals of World War I
Conservative Party (UK) MPs for English constituencies
UK MPs 1924–1929
Members of London County Council
Companions of the Order of St Michael and St George
Royal Flying Corps officers
British Army personnel of World War I
Royal Warwickshire Fusiliers officers